The 2007 Tokyo Marathon was the inaugural edition of the annual marathon race in Tokyo, Japan and was held on Sunday, 18 February. The competition replaced the Tokyo International Marathon, an elite men-only competition held since 1981. The new competition included a mass race open to the public. 

The men's race was won by Kenyan Daniel Njenga in a time of 2:09:45, while the women's race was won by home athlete Hitomi Niiya in 2:31:02. The organisers did not invite any elite level women runners to compete at the marathon, but Niiya (a national representative at under-20 level) started the race alongside members of the public for her marathon debut and finished nearly 19 minutes ahead of the opposition. Several older professional female runners in their 40s finished behind Niiya, with Mari Tanigawa (1991 winner of the Tokyo International Women's Marathon) finishing as runner-up, 1990s Olympic medalist Yuko Arimori in fifth, and ultradistance runner Mami Kudo in ninth.

Results

Men

Women

References

Results
 Results. Association of Road Racing Statisticians. Retrieved 2020-04-05.

External links

 Official website

Tokyo Marathon
Tokyo Marathon
Tokyo
2007 in Tokyo
Tokyo Marathon